The United Soccer Coaches Hall of Fame is a non-profit institution established in 1991 that honors college soccer achievements in the United States. Induction into the hall is widely considered the highest honor in American college soccer.

Inductees 
As of 2022, there are over 70 inductees in the United Soccer Coaches Hall of Fame.

See also 
 National Soccer Hall of Fame
 United Soccer Coaches

References

External links 
 United Soccer Coaches Hall of Fame

American soccer trophies and awards
United S
College sports halls of fame in the United States
Soccer
Sports museums in Missouri
Museums in Jackson County, Missouri
Awards established in 1991
Sports organizations established in 1991
Museums established in 1991
1991 establishments in Missouri
1991 in sports